The Czech ambassador in Washington, D. C. is the official representative of the Government in Prague to the Government of the United States.

History

List of representatives

See also
Czech Republic–United States relations

References 
Notes

Sources

 
 
United States
Czech Republic